The Stahlhelm is a German military steel combat helmet intended to provide protection against shrapnel and fragments of grenades. The term Stahlhelm refers both to a generic steel helmet and more specifically to the distinctive German military design.

The armies of major European powers introduced helmets of this type during World War I. The German Army began to replace the traditional boiled leather Pickelhaube with the Stahlhelm in 1916. The Stahlhelm, with its distinctive "coal scuttle" shape, was instantly recognizable and became a common element of propaganda on both sides, just like the Pickelhaube before it. The name was also used by Der Stahlhelm, a post–World War I organization for German ex-servicemen that existed from 1918 to 1935. After World War II, the German  continued to call their standard helmet Stahlhelm, but the design was based on the American M1 helmet. The Bundesgrenzschutz, however, continued to use the original German design, until both troops switched to the new M92 Aramid helmet.

Development
At the beginning of World War I, none of the combatants were issued with any form of protection for the head other than cloth and leather caps, designed at most to protect against sabre cuts. When trench warfare began, the number of casualties on all sides suffering from severe head wounds (more often caused by shrapnel bullets or shell fragments than by gunfire) increased dramatically, since the head was typically the most exposed part of the body when in a trench. The French were the first to see a need for more protection—in mid-1915 they began to issue Adrian helmets to their troops. The British and Commonwealth troops followed with the Brodie helmet (a development of which was also later worn by US forces) and the Germans with the Stahlhelm.

As the German army hesitated to develop effective head protection, some units developed provisional, makeshift helmets in 1915. Stationed in the rocky area of the Vosges the Army Detachment "Gaede" recorded significantly more head injuries caused by stone and shell splinters than did troops in other sectors of the front. The artillery workshop of the Army Detachment developed a helmet that consisted of a leather cap with a steel plate (6 mm thickness). The plate protected not only the forehead but also the eyes and nose.

The Stahlhelm was quite deep relative to the thickness of the steel; one American company that tried to press steel of similar thickness into the shape of the much shallower Brodie helmet was unable to do so. The original WW1 Stahlhelm wasn't bullet-resistant to pistol rounds such as 9mm Luger and 45 ACP. The steel quality by WW2 had improved enough to stop low velocity handgun rounds such as .380 ACP and 45 ACP as demonstrated by ballistic test videos on YouTube.

History

The design of the Stahlhelm was carried out by Dr Friedrich Schwerd of the Technical Institute of Hanover. In early 1915, Schwerd had carried out a study of head wounds suffered during trench warfare and submitted a recommendation for steel helmets, shortly after which he was ordered to Berlin. Schwerd then undertook the task of designing and producing a suitable helmet, broadly based on the 15th-century sallet, which provided good protection for the head and neck.

After lengthy development work, which included testing a selection of German and Allied headgear, the first stahlhelm were tested in November 1915 at the Kummersdorf Proving Ground and then field-tested by the 1st Assault Battalion. Thirty thousand examples were ordered, but it was not approved for general issue until New Year of 1916, hence it is most usually referred to as the "Model 1916". In February 1916 it was distributed to troops at Verdun, following which the incidence of serious head injuries fell dramatically. The first German troops to use this helmet were the stormtroopers of the Sturm-Bataillon Nr. 5 (Rohr), commanded by Captain Willy Rohr.

In contrast to the Hadfield steel used in the British Brodie helmet, the Germans used a harder martensitic silicon/nickel steel. As a result, and also due to the helmet's form, the Stahlhelm had to be formed in heated dies at a greater unit cost than the British helmet, which could be formed in one piece.

Like the British and French, German troops identified highly with their helmets. The Stahlhelm became a popular symbol of paramilitary groups after the First World War. Such was the attachment of the World War One generation to the design that it was reportedly the reason that Hitler rejected a modernised, sloping helmet design to replace it.

Stahlhelm use in other countries

Germany exported versions of the M1935 helmet to various countries. Versions of the M1935 Stahlhelm were sent to Republic of China from 1935 to 1936 and the M1935 was the main helmet of the Chinese Nationalist Army (especially the "central" divisions) during World War II. Spain also received shipments of the helmet. During the inter-war years, several military missions were sent to South America under the command of Hans Kundt. After the Chaco War, the Bolivian army adopted the Stahlhelm and continued using it until recently. The exported M1935 helmets were similar to the German issue, except for a different liner.

Some countries manufactured their own helmets using the M1935 design, and this basic design was in use in various nations as late as the 1970s.

The Germans helped the Hungarians copy the M1935 design. The WWII M38 Hungarian steel helmet is nearly identical to the German M1935. Both have almost the same shape, riveted ventilation holes, and the classic rolled edge. Differences include somewhat rougher Hungarian finishing, a different liner and different rivets position – the split pins are situated behind the ventilation holes. A square metal bracket is riveted on the rear, above the back brim, to secure the helmet to the knapsack while marching. It was typically painted in Hungarian brown-green, though blue-grey versions existed. It is sometimes called the "Finnish M35" due to its extensive use by the Finnish Army during the Continuation War 1941–44.

After World War I Poland seized large quantities of M1918 helmets. Most were later sold to various countries, including Spain. However, at the end of the 1930s, it was discovered that the standard Polish wz. 31 helmet was unsuitable for tank troops and motorized units; while offering decent protection, it was too large and heavy. As a stop-gap measure before a new helmet was developed, the General Staff decided to issue M1918 helmets to the 10th Motorized Cavalry Brigade, which used them during the September Campaign.

During the time of the Warsaw Uprising the helmet was also worn by the members of the Polish Home Army and it was during this time that the helmet became the symbol of the resistance, as every Stahlhelm worn by a soldier of the underground army signified a dead German occupier it was taken from.

In November 1926, the Irish Defence Forces adopted the Stahlhelm. As the Treaty of Versailles barred Germany from exporting steel helmets, the Irish turned to London-based Vickers, ordering 5,000 copies of a model closely resembling the M1918 helmet. The helmet remained in use until it was replaced by the British Mark II model in 1940. Following the outbreak of World War II, the helmets became the subject of anti-Irish propaganda in Britain. A large number of the withdrawn helmets were reissued to various emergency services after being painted white.

Switzerland used a helmet, designated the M1918, that was roughly similar to the M1916 but had a shallower, wider and more rounded crown and skirt. This was to protect against the harsh winter winds of the alpine regions.

The Chilean Army was a prolific user of the Vulkanfiber models, bought before the Second World War, along with a few M1935 and Czechoslovak M32 helmets. After the war, local production of lightweight fiber and plastic models started, which are still in ceremonial & garrison use today. Small runs of steel helmets were made by FAMAE in the 80's, but ultimately were not adopted due to the ascendance of kevlar and synthetic ballistic fiber helmets by that time. A Stahlhelm with crossed bayonets and the corresponding number is the standard insignia of infantry regiments.

During World War II, the Argentine Army adopted a similar model made of pressed fibre. For combat and provincial police use, imported Swiss M1918 Helmets were still in service as late as 1976.

In the Socialist Federal Republic of Yugoslavia, due to large quantities captured by World War II Partisans, the Stahlhelm was used in Yugoslav People's Army up to 1959, when it was phased out and replaced by the M59/85 steel helmet.

Postwar
After World War II, West Germany's Bundesgrenzschutz border guards and some West German police units kept the Stahlhelm in their inventories (police units can be seen wearing them during footage of the Black September hostage crisis in 1972), and the Fallschirmjäger variant was used for some time by the GSG 9. With the re-armament of West Germany the Bundeswehr introduced the United States Army M1 Helmet which was replaced by a Kevlar helmet (Gefechtshelm), similar to the modern US helmets, in the 1990s. German firefighter units today still use Stahlhelm-shaped helmets in a fluorescent colour.

East Germany's National People's Army M-56 helmet was modelled on an unused 1942 German design with a more conical shape. The Chilean Army still uses the Stahlhelm design for ceremonial purposes, as does the Bolivian Army. There are also some Japanese bicycle helmets (with accompanying goggles) that resemble the Stahlhelm. Many schools and universities in Mexico such as the Autonomous University of Baja California have military bands that use or resemble the M35 Stahlhelm.

The U.S. Army's 1980s and 1990s era Kevlar Personnel Armor System for Ground Troops Helmet was sometimes called the "Fritz helmet" for its resemblance to the Stahlhelm. The U.S. Army and Marines have continued to use a design akin to the PASGT helmet with the MICH TC-2000 Combat Helmet and Lightweight Helmet, respectively.

The Chinese People's Liberation Army soldiers still used M1935 helmets which were captured from the Chinese Nationalist Army during the Chinese Civil War until the 1970s.

Since 2012, El Salvador's Policia Nacional Civil use a navy/indigo blue-coloured helmet that strongly resembles the Stahlhelm; this helmet is used by some members of the riot-control unit and rarely used by the Police's assault teams.

Variants
The different Stahlhelm designs are named for their year of introduction. For example, the Modell 1942 which was introduced in 1942 is commonly known as M1942 or simply M42. Here, they are referred to by their M19XX names.

M1916 and M1917 

The Stahlhelm was introduced into regular service during the Verdun campaign in early 1916.

The M1916 design had side-mounted horn-like ventilator lugs which were intended to support an additional steel brow plate or Stirnpanzer, which saw limited use only by snipers and trench raiding parties, as it was too heavy for general use.

The shell came in different sizes, from 60 to 68, with some size 70s reported. Helmet weight varied from 0.98 kg to 1.4 kg, depending on shell size. The suspension, or liner, consisted of a headband with three segmented leather pouches, each holding padding materials, and leather or fabric cords that could be adjusted to provide a comfortable fit. The one-piece leather chin strap was attached to the shell by M1891 chinstrap lugs, the same kind used in the Pickelhaube helmet.

The M1916 design provided excellent protection. Reserve Lieutenant Walter Schulze of 8th Company Reserve Infantry Regiment 76 described his combat introduction to the helmet on the Somme, 29 July 1916:

... suddenly, with a great clanging thud, I was hit on the forehead and knocked flying onto the floor of the trench... a shrapnel bullet had hit my helmet with great violence, without piercing it, but sufficiently hard to dent it. If I had, as had been usual up until a few days previously, been wearing a cap, then the Regiment would have had one more man killed.

But the helmet was not without its flaws. The ventilator horns often let cold air in during the winter, requiring the wearer to block the vents with mud or fabric. The large, flared skirt tended to make it difficult for soldiers to hear, distorting surrounding sounds and creating an echo when the wearer spoke.

Originally painted Feldgrau (field grey), the Stahlhelm was often camouflaged by troops in the field using mud, foliage, cloth covers, and paint. Official issue cloth covers in white and grey appeared in late 1916 and early 1917. Camouflage paint was not formally introduced until July 1918, when German Army Order II, No 91 366, signed by General Erich Ludendorff on 7 July 1918, outlined official standards for helmet camouflage. The order stipulated that helmets should be painted in several colours, separated by a finger-wide black line. The colours should be relevant to the season, such as using green, brown and ochre in summer. In the closing months, some experiments were conducted on the Stahlhelm paint. Wollstaub was one such paint iteration that was infused with crushed felt in hopes of glare reduction.

After the effectiveness of the M1916 design was validated during the 1916 campaigns, incremental improvements were subsequently made. The M1917 version saw improvements to the liner but was otherwise identical to the original design.

M1918 

Extensive redesigns were made for the M1918 model. A new two-piece chin strap was introduced and was attached directly to the helmet liner rather than the shell. Certain examples of the M1918 had cutouts in the rim along the sides of the helmet. This iteration was dubbed the cavalry or telephone talker helmet, despite the fact that it was intended to be utilized by all units. It has incorrectly been said that these cutouts were to accommodate headphones while wearing the helmet. These cutouts were actually done to improve hearing and to reduce echo created by the large, flared skirt. About ten thousand were created in the closing months of the war.

The M1918 Stahlhelm can be distinguished from the M1916, as the M1918 shell lacks the chinstrap rivet on the lower side of the helmet skirt found on earlier models.

Another variant is the Armored Warfare Stahlhelm, created in sparing amounts for tank crews. The only difference was the extreme reduction of the visor extending over the eyes to allow for better visibility.

Austro-Hungarian variants 

Austria-Hungary purchased about 416,000 German helmets from November 1916 until the end of the war and also began its own licensed production starting in May 1917. Around a million Stahlhelm of all variants were issued until the end of the war.

Austrian M17 
The Austrian M17 helmet was similar to the German M16 but was coloured golden-brown (known as Isonzo-braun), had a cloth chinstrap and had the chinstrap rivet located higher up on the steel shell. From May 1917 till the end of World War I 534,013 were produced, many of which were manufactured at the Krupp in Berndorf, Lower Austria.
Other production locations included:
 Adolf Westen factory Celje, present day Slovenia
 Brunn am Gebirge, present day Austria
 C. A. Scholtz Mateocz, present day Slovakia
 Bruder Lapp, Rottenman u. Warcholowsky
 Nădrag, present day Romania
 Reșița, present day Romania
 Gebruder Bohler & Co. in Kapfenberg, present day Austria.

Hungarian M18 
The Hungarian M18 variant was similar to the Austrian M17 design, but the chinstrap rivet was smaller in size and located even higher up than the Austrian version. It was coloured in golden-brown (known as Isonzo-braun). These were manufactured at the Krupp in Berndorf, Lower Austria.

Berndorfer variant 
There was also a quite different, domestically developed Berndorfer variant. 139,968 were produced from May till November 1917 at the Krupp in Berndorf, Lower Austria

Ottoman variant 
The formation in 1917 by the Ottoman Empire of stormtrooper battalions following the German model prompted the requirement for steel helmets, as these had not previously been adopted. Although German helmets were ordered, Ottoman officers believed that the design impeded the soldiers' ability to hear orders in the field and requested that the visor, ear and neck protectors be removed, which was done using grinding machines. Germany delivered 5,400 visorless versions of the M1918 helmet for the Ottoman Empire. The missing front visor was thought by the Germans to be for religious reasons, and it was claimed that it was to allow Turkish soldiers to touch their foreheads to the ground during prayer, without removing their helmets. However, this story has been disputed. The Turks rejected any more than the 5,400 delivered and an unknown number from the overrun were issued to German armed forces and were used by German Freikorps units after the war.

M1933 

In 1932 the Army High Command ordered the testing of a new prototype helmet intended to replace the older models. It was made entirely from a composite plastic material called "Vulkanfiber". The Model 1933 Vulkanfiber helmet kept the basic form of previous helmets but was much lighter. It was put into limited production following favourable field tests in early 1933 and small numbers were issued to Reichswehr infantry, artillery and communications units. It was removed from service following the introduction of the M1935 helmet and most of the remaining stock were reissued to civil organizations such as fire brigades and police forces. Some examples were also retained for parade use by senior officers, who were not generally issued with the Stahlhelm.

M1935 
In 1934 tests began on an improved Stahlhelm, whose design was a development of World War I models. The company "Eisenhüttenwerke Thale" (today Thaletec) carried out prototype design and testing, with Dr Friedrich Schwerd once again taking a hand.

The new helmet was pressed from sheets of molybdenum steel in several stages. The size of the flared visor and skirt was reduced, and the large projecting lugs for the obsolete armour shield were eliminated. The ventilator holes were retained but were set in smaller hollow rivets mounted to the helmet's shell. The edges of the shell were rolled over, creating a smooth edge along the helmet. Finally, a completely new leather suspension, or liner, was incorporated that greatly improved the helmet's safety, adjustability, and comfort for each wearer. These improvements made the new M1935 helmet lighter, more compact, and more comfortable to wear than the previous designs.

The Army's Supreme Command within the Third Reich's Wehrmacht or combined armed forces officially accepted the new helmet on June 25, 1935 and it was intended to replace all other helmets in service.

More than 1 million M1935 helmets were manufactured in the first two years after its introduction, and millions more were produced until 1940 when the basic design and production methods were changed.

Gladiator civil defense helmet

In 1938, the Germans developed a variant of the Stahlhelm with a wider, flared peak and ventilation holes originally intended for civil defense and Luftschutz personnel. Known as the gladiator pattern, the privately purchased Luftschutz helmet was originally made from three pieces of steel and typically painted black or dark blue. Later in the war these were issued to Volkssturm personnel, and sometimes repainted in Feldgrun. By 1944, the helmets were stamped from a single steel sheet, and the original leather lining replaced with vinyl or cloth to reduce costs.  A modified postwar version in fluorescent green, white or yellow continued to be issued to rescue workers in the Bundesrepublik until the early 1990s.

M1940 
The M1935 design was slightly modified in 1940 to simplify its construction, the manufacturing process now incorporating more automated stamping methods. The principal change was to stamp the ventilator hole mounts directly onto the shell, rather than utilizing separate fittings. In other respects, the M1940 helmet was identical to the M1935. The Germans still referred to the M1940 as the M1935, while the M1940 designation were given by collectors.

Fallschirmjäger version

A variant of the M1935 helmet with a shell lacking the projecting visor and deep flared rim was issued to Fallschirmjäger (German paratrooper) units. It was so designed in order to lessen the risk of head injury on landing after a parachute jump; also to reduce the significant wind resistance and resulting neck trauma. Early Fallschirmjäger helmets were manufactured from existing M1935 helmets by removing the undesirable projections, which were omitted when the new design entered full production. The modified shell also incorporated a completely different and more substantial liner and chinstrap design that provided far more protection for German airborne troops. The chinstrap featured a four-point retention system that has come into use again by modern combat helmets such as the MICH since the late 1990s.

M1942 
The M1942 design was a result of wartime demands, by order of Hitler, to ‘maintain intimidation but reduce cost’. The rolled edge on the shell was eliminated, creating an unfinished edge along the rim. This edge slightly flared out, along the base of the skirt, reducing the protection the helmet gave. The elimination of the rolled edge expedited the manufacturing process and reduced the amount of metal used in each helmet. Shell paint colours were typically matte grey-green (Heer) or grey-blue (Luftwaffe), and the decals were eliminated in 1943 to speed up production and reduce the helmet's combat visibility. Greater manufacturing flaws were also observed in M1942 helmets made late in the war.

M1944 
A simpler variant, designed in 1942 by the Institute for Defence Technical Materials Science in Berlin, was also stamped out of one piece of metal, but with sloped sides. It was similar in appearance to the British 1944 Type Mk III helmet.

M1945 
There have been reports of a variant manufactured in the last months of the war. The M1945 was reported to have been similar to the M1942 design but did away completely with the ventilator. These helmets are reported to be extremely rare. Many collectors and historians are of the opinion that the M1945 helmet is just a regular M1942 helmet that lacked the vents simply because of machine malfunctions in the factory, or unfinished M1942 helmets that were completed in the post-war era.

East Germany

M1954 
It was an evolution of the prototype M1944 with a modified and more squared line. The appearance of the helmet was a transitional way between the M35 and the M44. It was nicknamed Kesslerbombe with reference to the General Keßler. It was used by the KVP of the DDR and it was fitted with two different suspension systems during its life in service. The first one fixed with three rivets as in the WW2 models, the second type required further holes in the helmet shell. It was substituted by the helmet M1956.

M1956

The East German M-56 helmet was originally designed in 1942 as a replacement for the M1935/M1940 model Stahlhelm. It was initially developed for the Wehrmacht by the Institute for Defense Technical Materials Science in Berlin (see M1944 above). The helmet had seen trials since 1943 but was not adopted during World War II.

The design was not used until the requirement for a distinct German helmet for the Volkspolizei and the National People's Army arose. The East German leadership was motivated in large part by a desire to avoid provoking the offence that using a traditional Stahlhelm design would have caused East Germany's Warsaw Pact allies (especially Czechoslovakia, Poland and the Soviet Union), but a more practical military necessity was also present due to the continued use of surplus Stahlhelmen by West German units, in particular border guards. Moreover, the East Germans suspected the West could re-issue the Stahlhelm on a general basis in the Bundeswehr at any time and therefore needed a helmet that was easily distinguishable from that of their potential enemy. For both reasons, the 1942 design was likely chosen because it was the most similar of all German designs to the most recognizable Soviet helmets, in particular the iconic SSh-40 design. Such a design not only served a political purpose but was one that NATO armies were unlikely to closely duplicate. Indeed, the M-56 was similar enough in appearance to the SSh-40 that some Westerners failed to realize its German origins altogether and assumed the East Germans had adopted a Soviet design.

The M-56 helmet came in three basic versions, Mod 1 or I/56, Mod 2 or I/57 and Mod 3 or I/71, and was widely sold (or given) to Third World armies.

West Germany

M40/51 
When the Bundesgrenzschutz (BGS) (Federal Border Guards of Germany) was formed in 1951, it was supplied with old salvaged and refurbished M35, M40 or M42 helmets. Among the changes made, there was the replacement of the interior and the introduction of new eyelets for the chinstrap, some welded inside the helmet some even fixed to the helmet with rivets. The helmets for the BGS were repainted in dark green RAL 6012.

With the progressive depletion of stocks, starting from 1951 new helmets were produced following the construction rules of the M40 model. Regarding the interior, was used the simplified M31 type, with a chinstrap directly fixed to it, (adopted above all by the police forces of the Länder), and a liner with a chinstrap fixed to the helmet according to the methods described above; this version was adopted by the BGS.

M40/53 

Starting from 1953 a further update of the interior was introduced with the type called I53, developed by the company Schuberth Werke Braunschweig.

This interior was no longer fixed with the classic three nails that ran along the helmet shell but by a screw placed inside, in the center of the upper part of the helmet.

For this reason the helmet is recognizable from the previous versions by the absence of the rivets on the shell. In later versions, the ventilation holes were also removed. As regards to the fastening of the chinstrap, were used the same solutions of the previous model.

Bundeswehr M56 

The West German M-56 Stahlhelm was a direct copy of the U.S. M1 helmet. It was properly called "zweiteiliger Stahlhelm" (two-piece steel helmet). In 1958 the helmet was made as a one-piece helmet and renamed Stahlhelm M1A1. The M1A1 came in three sizes: 66, 68, and 71. This helmet was used until 1981 when a modified version was released and renamed the Helm1A1. Modifications included a 3-point chin strap with the third point connecting at the nape, extra-large sizes, and a further adjustable liner.

The M1A1 Stahlhelm remained in service until 1992 when the Bundeswehr replaced it with a PASGT-derived kevlar helmet called the Gefechtshelm ("Combat helmet").

Decals and insignia
After Stahlhelm shells were painted, the colours of which varied by organization, small identification or insignia decals usually were affixed to one or both sides of the helmet. Almost every military, naval, and political organization had its own distinctive insignia, which was applied as decals to the sides of helmets. The right side of early M35 helmets bore the tricolored shield of black, white, and red stripes, the traditional national colors of the pre-WWI German Empire (cf. the black, red, and gold of today's Federal Republic of Germany, harking back to the 1848 Revolt). The left side of the shell often received decal insignia denoting the branch of the armed forces, or Wehrmacht, or an organization within the Nazi Party.

The combined Wehrmacht military forces of Nazi Germany consisted of the Heer (army), the Kriegsmarine (navy), and the Luftwaffe (air force). While not technically part of the Wehrmacht, the Waffen-SS ("Armed-SS") tactically operated as such and was considered part of Germany's armed forces during the war. The same was true of some Sturmabteilung (SA) units, along with other subsidiary organizations, which functioned as part of the armed forces particularly towards the end of the war. Wehrmacht branches typically displayed distinctive emblems in the form of decals on their helmets. The Heer, or army, displayed a black shield bearing the frontal view of a silver-coloured German eagle holding a swastika in its talons (known as the Reichsadler), while the navy used the same eagle emblem in gold. Luftwaffe decals displayed the side view of an eagle in flight, also holding a swastika. The SS was both a paramilitary and a political organization, and its black runic initials on a silver-coloured shield (normally applied to the right side of the shell) looked like twin lightning bolts. Other military, political, and civil or defence organizations used similar decal insignia to distinguish their helmets. Such visible identification devices were gradually abandoned as the war progressed, however, so that by war's end most Wehrmacht helmet insignia had been eliminated to reduce the wearer's visibility in combat.

For the Chinese Nationalist Army soldiers, their M35 helmets were stencilled with the Chinese Nationalist Insignia on the left side. Bolivian Army personnel carry the national flag decal on their Stahlhelms when in the full dress.

Fiction
The German army Stahlhelm, as well as the Japanese Kabuto, served as a template for the fictional character's Darth Vader outfit in the Star Wars franchise.

Members of the Wolf Brigade, a fictional Japanese unit in the anime Jin-Roh: The Wolf Brigade are equipped with Stahlhelme, as well as Wehrmacht weapons of the Second World War, including StG 44s and MG 42s.

Users

  (M1918)
 
 
  (M35~M42)
  (M56)
  (for Bundesgrenzschutz use, copies of M35)
  (M35)
  (M35, Captured from the Nationalists)
 

 
  in 1926-1940 
 
 
 
  (M36)
 
 
  (M16-18)
  (Försökshjälm Modell B. A variant to the M1926)
  (limited use by ELAS)
 
 
 
 
 
 
 

 A hardboard local made helmet called M38 was used between 1938 and 1956.
  (limited use of M1916, replaced by M26 Adrian Helmets in 1938)
 (M1916, M1918)

 (M1918)

 – interwar Polish state issued WW1 stahlhelms to Border Protection Corps, 10th Motorized Cavalry Brigade, and state police units. During the World War II helmets captured from the German occupying force were used by Polish underground formations.
  Russian White movement - supplied by Germany to West Russian Volunteer Army troops in the Russian Civil War.
 (used by National Guard in 60s and spotted in Battle of Ben Guerdane picture of tunisian national guard officer wearing Stahlhelm )

 M56

 (The M56 East German helmet was supplied to People's Army of Vietnam and Viet Cong troops in the Vietnam War) see picture of a PAVN rally or parade, picture of a U.S P.O.W being guarded by a PAVN troop with an M56 Helmet, PAVN drivers with a M56 helmets, they were commonly used by drivers.

See also
 Pickelhaube
 Sallet
 Der Stahlhelm
 Wehrmacht uniforms
 Brodie helmet
 Adrian helmet

Notes

References
 

  Special exhibition at Bayerisches Armeemuseum, Ingolstadt.
 Collecting German WW2 helmets in the 21st century : https://germanhelmetvault.com/

External links 
 

1916 establishments in Germany
20th-century fashion
Combat helmets of Germany
Combat helmets of Poland
German words and phrases
German military uniforms
Products introduced in 1916
World War I military equipment of Austria-Hungary
World War I military equipment of Germany
World War II military equipment of China
World War II military equipment of Germany